Anti-Masonic may refer to:

 Anti-Masonry, diverse movement
 Anti-Masonic Party, active in the US from 1828 to 1838